= The Art of Noise (radio show) =

1994 short-lived radio program

The Art of Noise is a radio programme that aired in December 1994. There were three hour-long episodes and it was broadcast on BBC Radio 1. It starred George Martin.
